A list of films produced by the Bollywood film industry based in Mumbai in 1925:

1925 in Indian cinema
The number of films rose from 11 in 1919, to 88 in 1925. 
Chandulal Shah started his directing career in films with Vimla for Laxmi Films. He directed two more films before moving to Kohinoor Film Company. He went on to form his own studios Ranjit Film Company (Ranjit Studios) in 1929.
V. Shantaram, who started his career assisting Baburao Painter, made his acting debut as the main lead as the young village peasant in Savkari Pash.
D. Billimoria (Dinshaw Billimoria) made his debut in a lead role in N. D. Sarpotdar's Chhatrapati Sambhaji.

Films
Savkari Pash directed by Baburao Painter for Maharashtra Film Company, Kolhapur, was the acting debut of V. Shantaram. The film was the "earliest example" of parallel cinema in its realistic depiction of social issues.
The Light of Asia was directed by Franz Osten with assistance from Himanshu Rai; it starred Rai in the role of Siddhartha (Buddha). The film was adapted from Edwin Arnold's epic poem The Light of Asia (1861). 
Kulin Kanta directed by Homi Master for Kohinoor Film Company was based on a real-life murder involving the Maharaja Tukoji Rao Holkar III of Indore and a dancing girl. 
Mojili Mumbai a.k.a. Slaves Of Luxury directed by Manilal Joshi was cited to be based on a real-life story of a cabaret dancer Roshanara, the film "sparked" a debate on "morality and cinematic realism".  
Mumbai Ni Mohini, also called Social Pirates, directed by Nanubhai Desai, was a real-life crime drama.

A-F

G-K

L-R

S

T-Z

References

External links
Bollywood films of 1925 at IMDb

1925
Bollywood
Films, Bollywood